Bergsma is a toponymic surname of West Frisian origin. People with the name include:

Alaina Bergsma (b. 1990), American volleyball player
Bert Bergsma (b. 1955), Netherlands Olympic swimmer
Deanne Bergsma (b. 1941), South African ballerina
Han Bergsma (b. 1961), Dutch Olympic sailor 
Heather Bergsma née Richardson (b. 1989), American speed skater
 (1838–1915), Dutch Minister of Colonial Affairs 1894–97
John Bergsma (b. 1971), American Catholic theologian
Jorrit Bergsma (b. 1986), Dutch speed skater
Léon Bergsma (b. 1997), Dutch football player
Stuart Bergsma (b. 1903), American medical missionary
Titia Bergsma (1786–1821), First Dutch (and Western) Woman in Japan in 1817
William Bergsma (1921–1994), American composer

Surnames of Frisian origin
Toponymic surnames